David Bell was a Scottish television producer and director in the light entertainment genre. In the mid-1980s, he became head of light entertainment at LWT. Live From Her Majesty's, Copy Cats and The Stanley Baxter Show number amongst his successes. He died of AIDS, aged 52.
In 1978 Bell was involved with Michael Grade's move bringing Bruce Forsyth to ITV to present a Saturday night spectacular. On the back of his mammoth success with The Generation Game, Forsyth was never settled with ITV's two-hour multi-format evening of glitz, mini-soaps, game shows and gags. None of which was for want of trying by David Bell, whose biting wit and flair meant he enjoyed the respect of all in his production team.

1936 births
1990 deaths
British television directors
British television producers
Scottish television producers
AIDS-related deaths in England
20th-century British businesspeople